Maximiliano Ariel "Maxi" Stanic (born December 2, 1978 in Morón, Buenos Aires) is an Argentine-Italian professional basketball player who currently plays for Atenas Cordoba, from Argentina. He plays at the point guard position.

Professional career
During his pro club career, Stanic has played in Argentina, Italy, France, Spain, and Brazil, where he played with SE Palmeiras.

National team career
Stanic was a member of the Argentine national team that won the 2008 FIBA South American Championship.

References

External links
FIBA Profile
Latinbasket.com Profile
Spanish League 
Italian League 
French League Profile 
Brazilian League Profile 

1978 births
Living people
Argentine expatriate basketball people in Spain
Argentine men's basketball players
Argentine people of Croatian descent
Atenas basketball players
Boca Juniors basketball players
CB Valladolid players
Ciclista Olímpico players
Élan Béarnais players
Italian men's basketball players
Liga ACB players
Novo Basquete Brasil players
Obradoiro CAB players
Pallacanestro Pavia players
Point guards
Scafati Basket players
Sociedade Esportiva Palmeiras basketball players
Victoria Libertas Pallacanestro players
People from Morón Partido
Sportspeople from Buenos Aires Province